REK may refer to: 

 Rek people, of South Sudan 
 Rek language
 Rek, a Cambodian board game
 Vitold Rek (born 1955), Polish musician
 Rek or Reg, Iran, Khusf County, South Khorasan Province
 Rek or Rig-e Bala, a village in Khusf County, South Khorasan Province, Iran
 Rek or Rik, Iran, a village in Talesh County, Gilan Province

See also